Donkey Punch the Night is the third EP by American alternative rock act Puscifer. It was released on February 19, 2013, via Puscifer Entertainment.

Background

Donkey Punch the Night is the follow-up to Puscifer's 2011 album Conditions of My Parole and features two new tracks  ("Breathe" and "Dear Brother") as well as two covers, "Bohemian Rhapsody" by Queen and "Balls to the Wall" by Accept. Also included are remixes of the new tracks and of one cover.

The EP was released on February 19, 2013 in digital and CD formats, with a vinyl format later released on March 12, 2013. The EP was announced, along with the track listing and a set of Australian tour dates. The EP features some of the same line-up as Conditions of My Parole, including Keenan on vocals, Carina Round on vocals and guitar, Mat Mitchell on bass, guitar and programming, Juliette Commagere on additional vocals, Josh Eustis on guitar and piano, Matt McJunkins on bass and Jeff Friedl on drums and percussion, as well as guest musicians Zac Rae on piano, Josh Morreau on bass and Claire Acey on vocals. Artists included for the remixes include Drumcell, SONOIO, Jonathan Bates and DJ Silent Servant.

Track listing

Personnel
Maynard James Keenan – lead vocals
Carina Round – additional vocals, guitar
Mat Mitchell – bass, guitar, programming
Josh Eustis – guitar, piano
Matt McJunkins – bass
Juliette Commagere – additional vocals
Jeff Friedl – drums, percussion
Zac Rae – piano
Josh Morreau – bass
Claire Acey – vocals

References

Puscifer EPs
2013 EPs
Self-released EPs